Jason Hill (born in Hereford, England) is an English born Scottish Club XV international rugby union player who plays for Heriot's Rugby at the Flanker or Number Eight positions. He previously played for Glasgow Warriors, Stirling County, Heriots and Bedford Blues.

Rugby Union career

Amateur career

He played for Stirling County and most recently Heriots before securing a professional contract.

The 2014–15 season was a triumph for Hill as he won the BT Premiership Player of the Season and the award for try of the season, the Brigadier Frank Coutts Memorial award. Hill also secured Heriot's BT Premiership title with a last minute try over Melrose in the play-off final at Goldenacre.

In 2019 Jason ventured down under to play a season in Australia, playing in Newcastle's NHRU competition with the four time reigning premiers - Hamilton Hawks. Jason started in the 2019 NHRU Grand Final helping Hamilton secure their fifth straight premiership by beating Wanderers 36-7 and was awarded the John Hipwell Medal for the 'Man of the Match'.

Professional career

Jason Hill signed for the Glasgow Warriors in 2015–16 after training with the Pro12 club from February to the end of the 2014–15 season.

The one-year partnership contract signed allows Hill to play for Heriots when not playing for the Glasgow Warriors.

He is contracted to Glasgow Warriors until 2016. He made his debut for Glasgow Warriors in the pre-season friendly against Clermont. He then played in Warriors pre-season international friendly against Canada and their early season friendly against the British Army rugby union team.

On 13 May 2016 Hill signed for Bedford Blues in the RFU Championship.

It was announced on 16 May 2017 that Hill would sign for Doncaster Knights for the 2017-18 season.

Hill now plays for the Super 6 side Heriot's Rugby.

International career

Hill has represented Scotland at Under 18 and Under 20 level, and at Club XV level.

Called up for the Scotland Club XV international side which is made up of the best club players in the country, Hill was to score a vital try in the win over Ireland Club XV at Melrose. He was awarded the man of the match for his performance.

References

External links 
 Warriors sign quartet of players

1990 births
Living people
Bedford Blues players
Doncaster R.F.C. players
Glasgow Warriors players
Heriot's RC players
Rugby union players from Hereford
Scotland Club XV international rugby union players
Scottish rugby union players
Stirling County RFC players
Rugby union flankers